Alecrim Futebol Clube, also known as Alecrim, are a Brazilian football team from Natal, Rio Grande do Norte. They competed in the Série A in 1986.

History
Alecrim Futebol Clube were founded on August 15, 1915, by a group of boys that included the future Brazilian President, Café Filho. They won the Campeonato Potiguar seven times. Alecrim competed in the Série A in 1986 when they were eliminated in the first stage of the competition.

On February 4, 1968, the famous player Garrincha played a game for Alecrim against Sport. In 2012, Alecrim appointed  Englishman Anthony Armstrong-Emery, as the first foreign President of a Brazilian club.

Stadium
Alecrim played their home games at Estádio Dr. João Cláudio Vasconcelos Machado, commonly known as Machadão. The stadium had a maximum capacity of 45,000 people. At the end of 2013, Alecrim moved to a new 10,500 capacity stadium, which has the potential for expansion to 25,000.  The new stadium will also host an academy.

Players with current contract

Achievements

Campeonato Potiguar: 7
1924, 1925, 1963, 1964, 1968, 1985, 1986
 Campeonato Brasileiro Série D
4th (2009,promoted)

References

External links

Association football clubs established in 1915
Football clubs in Rio Grande do Norte
1915 establishments in Brazil